Janusz Andrzej Adamiec (born April 29, 1962) is a former Polish ice hockey player. He played for the Poland men's national ice hockey team at the 1984 Winter Olympics in Sarajevo, the 1988 Winter Olympics in Calgary, and the 1992 Winter Olympics in Albertville.

References

External links 
 
 
 

1962 births
Living people
Polish ice hockey right wingers
Olympic ice hockey players of Poland
Ice hockey players at the 1984 Winter Olympics
Ice hockey players at the 1988 Winter Olympics
Ice hockey players at the 1992 Winter Olympics
Sportspeople from Katowice
20th-century Polish people